Marriage Story is a 2019 American comedy-drama film written, directed and produced by Noah Baumbach. The film stars Adam Driver, Scarlett Johansson, Laura Dern, Alan Alda, Ray Liotta, Azhy Robertson, Julie Hagerty, Merritt Wever, and Wallace Shawn and follows a married couple going through a coast-to-coast divorce.  The film had its world premiere at the Venice Film Festival on August 29, 2019, and began a limited theatrical release on November 6, 2019, followed by digital streaming on December 6.

Marriage Story received critical acclaim, particularly for Baumbach's screenplay and direction, as well as its acting (particularly that of Johansson, Driver, and Dern), and musical score. It was chosen by the American Film Institute and the National Board of Review as one of the ten best films of the year. At the 77th Golden Globe Awards, the film received a leading six nominations, including Best Motion Picture – Drama, winning for Best Supporting Actress – Motion Picture. The film received eight nominations at the 25th Critics' Choice Awards, and three nominations at the 26th Screen Actors Guild Awards for the performances of Driver, Johansson, and Dern.

Accolades

Notes

See also
 2019 in film

References

External links 
 

Lists of accolades by film